Bell Tower Building, or the Allegany County League for Crippled Children building, is a historic building in Cumberland, Allegany County, Maryland. It was built in 1887 and is a two-story brick structure topped by a small wooden tower with an open belfry.  This was the first separate building to be used as police headquarters and jail in Cumberland.

It was listed on the National Register of Historic Places in 1973.

References

External links
, including photo from 1971, at Maryland Historical Trust

Buildings and structures in Cumberland, Maryland
Government buildings on the National Register of Historic Places in Maryland
Government buildings completed in 1887
National Register of Historic Places in Allegany County, Maryland